The Traunviertel (literally German for the Traun quarter or district) is an Austrian region belonging to the state of Upper Austria: it is one of four "quarters" of Upper Austria the others being Hausruckviertel, Mühlviertel, and Innviertel. Its name refers to the river Traun which passes through the area.

Region
The region is equivalent with the Austrian political districts of Linz-Land, Steyr-Land, Kirchdorf, Gmunden, Steyr and the city of Linz (only the parts south of river Danube. Major towns in Traunviertel include Linz (the capital of Upper Austria), Gmunden, Kirchdorf an der Krems and Steyr.

References

Geography of Upper Austria